Waring is an unincorporated community in northwestern Kendall County, Texas, United States. It lies along local roads and the Guadalupe River, northwest of the city of Boerne, the county seat of Kendall County.  Its elevation is 1,345 feet (410 m). Although Waring is unincorporated, it has a post office, with the ZIP code of 78074; the ZCTA for ZIP Code 78074 had a population of 59 at the 2000 census. The community is part of the San Antonio Metropolitan Statistical Area.

Founded in 1887 by R.P.M. Waring, the community was named for its founder's hometown of Waringford in Ireland; the name was not changed until 1901.  From its foundation until service ceased in 1970, the community was a station on the Kerrville branch of the San Antonio and Aransas Pass Railway.

Major roads
Waring Welfare Road
Farm to Market Road 1621

Gallery

References

External links
Profile of Waring from the Handbook of Texas Online

Unincorporated communities in Kendall County, Texas
Unincorporated communities in Texas
Greater San Antonio
Populated places on the Guadalupe River (Texas)